Ben Vautier, also known simply as Ben (born 18 July 1935 in Naples, Italy), is a French artist. Vautier lives and works in Nice, where he ran a record shop called Magazin between 1958 and 1973.

Biography 
Benjamin Vautier was born on 18 July 1935 in Naples, Italy to a French family. He is the great-grandson of the Swiss painter  (1829-1898).

He discovered Yves Klein and the Nouveau Réalisme in the 1950s, but he became quickly interested in the French dada artist Marcel Duchamp and the music of John Cage. In 1959, Vautier founded the journal Ben Dieu. In 1960, he had his first one-man show, Rien et tout in Laboratoire 32.

Ben joined George Maciunas in the Fluxus artistic movement, in October 1962.

He is also active in Mail-Art and is mostly known for his text-based paintings or écritures began in 1953, with his work Il faut manger. Il faut dormir. Another example of the latter is "L'art est inutile. Rentrez chez vous" (Art is Useless, Go Home). A notable work made for Harald Szeemann's Documenta 5 exhibition in 1972 shouts, “KUNST IST ÜBERFLÜSSIG” (English: Art is Superfluous), and was installed across the top of the Fridericianum museum in Kassel, Germany.

He has long defended the rights of minorities in all countries, and he has been influenced by the theories of François Fontan about ethnism. For example, he has defended the Occitan language (southern France).

In 1981, he coined the name of the French art movement of the 1980s Figuration Libre (Free Figuration).

His work is included in some of the most important collections in the world, including MOMA in New York or Museo Reina Sofía in Madrid. The Centre Pompidou in Paris has Ben Vautier's Magasin, a massive piece, on permanent display. In 2022 the MUAC in Mexico City organized one of the most ambitious exhibitions about Vautier, curated by Ferran Barenblit.

See also
 a French Wikipedia article to understand what is ethnism

References

Internal link
Anti-art

Official website 
 Official website

French mixed-media artists
French contemporary artists
Fluxus
1935 births
Living people
Artists from Nice
20th-century French painters
20th-century French male artists
French male painters
21st-century French painters
21st-century French male artists